Aldo Di Clemente (born 1948) is an Italian amateur astronomer (active 1996–1997). He has worked as a technician at the Campo Imperatore station of the Osservatorio astronomico di Roma (Astronomical Observatory of Rome) since 1982. His assistance was valuable in conducting the Campo Imperatore Near-Earth Object Survey (CINEOS).

The main-belt asteroid 91214 Diclemente, discovered by astronomers Andrea Boattini and Luciano Tesi in 1998, was named in his honour. Naming citation was published on 15 December 2005.

References 
 

1948 births
Discoverers of asteroids
20th-century Italian astronomers
Living people